Princess Tamara Laura Czartoryska (Spanish: Tamara Laura María de los Dolores Luisa Fernanda Victoria y Todos los Santos Czartoryski y Picciotto; born 23 April 1978) is a Polish-Spanish former model, television star, and aristocrat. She is the daughter of Prince Adam Czartoryski y Borbón, first cousin to King Juan Carlos I of Spain.

Family and upbringing
Her mother, Nora Picciotto, was born in Cairo, worked as a public relations consultant in the film industry, and married her father in London. Her parents separated and divorced before she was seven years old.

She did poorly at the Sacred Heart all girls boarding school in Woldingham, except in drama, due to her being rebellious and fond of pranks. When she was 15, she attended a tutorial college in Oxford for A-levels. After her father suffered financial reverses when Lloyd's of London crashed, expensive pastimes such as riding stopped. That, and her mother's break-up with a stepfather of whom she was fond, left her confused and without direction, she has said.

In frustration with her behavior, her parents cut off her allowance. Having left home in hopes of a career in show jumping, she found herself, at the age of 15, earning her keep by cleaning out horse stables, where she sometimes slept. She credits this period with teaching her about the lives of people who lack wealth.

She enrolled at Emerson College in Boston when she was 18 to take up news media studies, again finding herself socializing with people who worked hard but earned little. However that did not, by her own account, prompt her to do well at a job as a waitress in a restaurant owned by a relative.

Returning to Europe with a reputation as a "society girl" that she felt obliged to live down, her initial foray into modeling proved challenging. But she was pleased with the opportunity to be represented by a reputable fashion agency.

The endowment of Czartoryski Museum by her father has been challenged by Tamara, and in 2018 resulted in the in-family lawsuit between Adam Karol and his daughter.

Ancestry
Paternally, Tamara belongs to the Czartoryski family who were one of the most influential nobles in pre-World War II Poland. She descends also from kings of Spain and France of the House of Bourbon through her grandmother, Princess Dolores de Borbón y Orléans, sister of King Juan Carlos's mother, whose dynastic surname she has appended to her own.

Personal life
She is married to Portuguese aristocrat Lourenco de Castro de Vasconcelos e Sa (b.1976) with whom she has one son Liam August (b.2018) and daughter Taya (b.2019).

Television
Her sporting achievements and aristocratic background led to roles as a presenter on a Thai kick boxing show, and appearances on Granada and Celebrity Five Go Dating.

In March 2005, Tamara was one of the contestants on series three of The Games and won the bronze medal.

In 2006, she appeared on the reality television programmes Australian Princess and American Princess during which she offered advice to the competitors.

In 2007, she was a contestant on Sky One's reality show Cirque de Celebrité.

Ancestry

References

1978 births
Living people
Spanish sportswomen
Spanish female models
Emerson College alumni
Tamara Laura
Spanish people of Polish descent
Spanish people of Jewish descent
Television personalities from London